The bishop of Tortosa is the ordinary of the Roman Catholic Diocese of Tortosa in Catalonia, Spain. The bishop is a suffragan of the archbishop of Tarragona.

List of bishops of Tortosa
Rufus 64–90?
Macianus (2nd century)
Quartus c. 156
Eustorgius (3rd century)
Exuperantius ?–369
Herodotus (4th century)
Lirios 364–399
Heros ca. 400 
Ervicius (6th century)
Ursus 516–525 
Assellus 525–546
Maurilius 546–580 
Julian 580–589
Froisclo 589–599 
Rufinus 614–633
John 633–638 
Afrilla 653–683
Caecilius 683–688/90 
Inviolatus 693–715
Muslim invasion
Paterno 1058
Berenguer (11th century)
Gaufroy d'Avignon 1151–1165
Ponç de Monells 1165–1193 
Gombau de Santa Oliva 1194–1212
Ponç de Torrella 1212–1254 
Bernat d'Olivella (Bernardo Olivella) 1254–1272
Arnau de Jardí 1272–1306 
Dalmau de Montoliu 1306
Pere de Batet (Pedro de Beteto) 1307–1310 
Francesc de Paulhac 1310–1316
Berenguer de Prat (Berenguer Prat) 1316–1341 
Guillem de Sentmenat 1341
Arnau de Lordat 1341–1346 
Bernat Oliver 1346–1348
Jaume Sitjó i Carbonell 1348–1351 
Esteve Malet 1351–1356
Joan Fabra (Juan Fabra) 1357–1362 
Jaume de Prades i de Foix (Jaime de Aragón) 1362–1369
Guillem de Torrelles 1369–1379 
Hug de Llupià–Bages (Hugo de Lupia y Bagés) 1379–1398, Appointed, Bishop of Valencia)
Pero de Luna y de Albornoz (administrator) 1399–1403 
Lluís de Prades i d'Arenós 1404
Francesc Climent dit Sa Pera (Francesco Climent Sapera, Pérez Clemente) 1407–1410 
Pero de Luna (administrator) 1410–1414
Ot de Montcada i de Luna (Otón de Montcada y de Luna) 1415–1473 
Alfons d'Aragó (Alfonso d'Aragona) 1475–1513
Juan de Enguera, O.P. (1512–1513 Died) 
Fra Lluís Mercader (Luis Mercader Escolano), O. Cart. (1513–1516)
Adriaan Florenszoom Dedel (Adriaan Floriszoon Boeyens) (Papa Adrian VI) 1516–1522
William of Enckenvoirt (Willem van Enckenvoirt) 1523–1534 
Fra Antoni de Calcena (Antonio Calcena) 1537–1539
Jeroni de Requesens (Jerónimo Requeséns) 1542–1548 
Ferran de Lloaces 1553–1560
Martín de Córdoba Mendoza 1560–1574
Fra Joan Izquierdo 1574–1585
Joan Terès i Borrull 1586–1587 
Joan Bta. Cardona 1587–1589
Gaspar Punter i Barreda 1590–1600 
Fra Pedro Manrique 1601–1611
Fra Isidor Aliaga 1611–1612 
Alfonso Márquez de Prado 1612–1616
Lluís de Tena 1616–1622 
Agustín Spínola Basadone 1623–1626
Justino Antolínez de Burgos y de Saavedra 1628–1637 
Giovanni Battista Veschi 1641–1655
Gregorio Parcero  1656–1663 
Fra Josep Fageda 1664–1685
Fra Sever Tomàs i Auter 1685–1700 
Silvestre Garcia Escalona 1702–1714
Juan Miguélez de Mendaña  1715–1717  
Bartolomé Camacho y Madueño 1720–1757
Francesc Borrull 1757–1758 
Luís García Mañero 1760–1765
Bernardo Velarde y Velarde 1765–1779 
Pedro Cortés y Larraz 1780–1786
Victoriano López Gonzalo 1787–1790 
Antonio José Salinas Moreno 1790–1812
Manuel Ros de Medrano 1815–1821 
Víctor Damián Sáez y Sánchez-Mayor 1824–1839
Damián gordo y Sáez 1848–1854 
Gil Esteve i tomàs 1858
Miquel Pratmans i Llambés 1860–1861 
Benet Vilamitjana i Vila 1862–1879
Francisco Aznar y Pueyo  1879–1893 
Pere Rocamora i Garcia 1894–1925
Félix bilbao y Ugarriza 1926–1943  
Manuel Moll i Salord 1943–1968
Ricard–Maria Carles i Gordó 1969–1990 
Lluís Martínez Sistach 1991–1997
Xavier Salinas i Vinyals 1997–2012
Enrique Benavent Vidal 2013–2022

References

External links
List of bishops of Tortosa 

Bishops from Catalonia
Tort